Hoya polyneura, commonly known as the fishtail hoya, is a species of flowering plant in the genus Hoya found from the Himalayas to northwest Yunnan. This species has a pendant, epiphytic growth habit, and its common name derives from the mermaid's tail shape and fine venation of the leaves.

References

polyneura
Plants described in 1883